Stanisław Dragan (21 November 1941 in Sadkowa Góra, Poland – 21 April 2007 in Kasinka Mała, Poland) is a boxer from Poland.

He competed for Poland in the 1968 Summer Olympics held in Mexico City, Mexico in the light-heavyweight event where he finished in third place.

References
Sports-reference

External links
 

1941 births
2007 deaths
Light-heavyweight boxers
Olympic boxers of Poland
Olympic bronze medalists for Poland
Boxers at the 1968 Summer Olympics
Olympic medalists in boxing
Medalists at the 1968 Summer Olympics
People from Mielec County
Sportspeople from Podkarpackie Voivodeship
Polish male boxers
21st-century Polish people
20th-century Polish people